Hawks Nest State Park is located on  in Fayette County near Ansted, West Virginia. The park's clifftop overlook along U.S. Route 60 provides a scenic vista of the New River, some 750 feet (230 m) below.  The hydro-electric project tunnel that passes underneath nearby Gauley Mountain was the scene of the Depression-era Hawks Nest Tunnel disaster.

The original building, now a gift shop and museum, was built as a Civilian Conservation Corps (CCC) project. The park lodge was constructed in 1967 by The Architects Collaborative (TAC).  The park's lodge and aerial gondola to the river are located about a mile further east from the overlook along U.S. 60, closer to the center of Ansted.

Features
 31 room lodge
 Restaurant
 Aerial tram between the lodge and the New River shore
 Swimming pool
 Hiking trails 
 Picnic area
 Gift shop
 River Nature Center
 Hawks Nest Rail Trail (1.8 mile)

Accessibility
Accessibility for the disabled was assessed by West Virginia University. The assessment found the park lodge and facilities to be generally accessible. However, during the 2005 assessment, some issues were identified with a stairway and with some exit lighting.

See also
Hawks Nest Tunnel Disaster
List of West Virginia state parks
State park

References

External links

 

Golf clubs and courses in West Virginia
Historic districts in Fayette County, West Virginia
National Register of Historic Places in Fayette County, West Virginia
Nature centers in West Virginia
Protected areas established in 1935
Protected areas of Fayette County, West Virginia
State parks of West Virginia
State parks of the Appalachians
1935 establishments in West Virginia
IUCN Category III